Albert Allard (1860 – May 1, 1941) was a Canadian politician and store owner. He was elected in 1910 as a Member of the House of Commons of Canada for the riding of the City of Ottawa, Ontario, and a member of the Liberal Party. He served for only 1 year, 7 months and 22 days.

Born  in Montreal, Canada East, the son of Jean-Baptiste Allard, he was educated at the Notre-Dame School of the Brothers of Christian Schools and came to Ottawa in 1872. He first worked as a grocery clerk, later becoming head of a wholesale grocery company. In 1885, he married Matilde Roberge. Allard was elected to the House of Commons in a 1910 by-election held after Wilfrid Laurier resigned his seat.

References 

1860 births
1941 deaths
Liberal Party of Canada MPs
Members of the House of Commons of Canada from Ontario
Politicians from Montreal